Mladen Bartolović (born 10 April 1977) is a Bosnian retired football player. A Bosnian Croat by descent, Bartolović opted to play for Bosnia and Herzegovina national team internationally.

Club career
Bartolović never played football before he was 16. He loved basketball, but during the Bosnian War, there were no basketball club active, so he decided to try himself as a football player. He formerly played for HNK Čapljina, Cibalia Vinkovci, Dinamo Zagreb, 1. FC Saarbrücken, Segesta Sisak, NK Zagreb and spent three seasons with Hajduk Split.

He moved to Foolad Khuzestan in summer 2009, becoming a player in the starting lineup for the team in his first season in the Iran Pro League.

International career
He made his debut for Bosnia and Herzegovina in a June 2003 European Championship qualification match away against Romania and has earned a total of 17 caps, scoring  one goal. His final international was a November 2008 friendly match against Slovenia.

Career statistics

Club

International goals

References

External links

1977 births
Living people
People from Zavidovići
Association football wingers
Bosnia and Herzegovina footballers
Bosnia and Herzegovina international footballers
HNK Segesta players
HNK Cibalia players
1. FC Saarbrücken players
GNK Dinamo Zagreb players
NK Zagreb players
HNK Hajduk Split players
Foolad FC players
Croatian Football League players
First Football League (Croatia) players
2. Bundesliga players
Persian Gulf Pro League players
Bosnia and Herzegovina expatriate footballers
Expatriate footballers in Croatia
Bosnia and Herzegovina expatriate sportspeople in Croatia
Expatriate footballers in Germany
Bosnia and Herzegovina expatriate sportspeople in Germany
Expatriate footballers in Iran
Bosnia and Herzegovina expatriate sportspeople in Iran
Bosnia and Herzegovina football managers
HNK Cibalia managers